Rubilen "Bingkay" Amit (born October 3, 1981) is a Filipino female professional pocket billiards (pool) player. Amit is the first Filipino woman to become a world pool champion.

Biography
Rubilen Amit was born in Mandaue, Cebu.
Amit began playing during her teens, often tagging along with her father Bobby at the Super Bowl in Makati. In college, she studied accountancy at the University of Santo Tomas. She participated in and won the 2000 and 2001 College of Commerce and Business Administration's billiards tournaments.  After graduating in 2004, Amit worked as a call center agent for a year. In 2005, she was accepted to the Philippine pool national team. However, in early 2013, Amit, along with other top Filipino pool players, was removed from the national team due to a controversial reorganization of the national team by the Billiards and Snooker Congress of the Philippines.

Titles 
 2005 Southeast Asian Games Eight-ball Singles
 2005 Southeast Asian Games Nine-ball Singles
 2007 Southeast Asian Games Nine-ball Singles
 2009 World Mixed Doubles Classic (with Efren Reyes)
 2009 Southeast Asian Games Nine-ball Singles
 2009 Southeast Asian Games Eight-ball Singles
 2009 WPA World Ten-ball Championship
 2009 Philippine Sportsman of the Year
 2011 World Mixed Doubles Classic (with Efren Reyes)
 2013 WPA World Ten-ball Championship
 2013 Southeast Asian Games Ten-ball Singles
 2019 Southeast Asian Games Nine-ball Singles
 2019 Southeast Asian Games Nine-ball Doubles
 2021 Southeast Asian Games Ten-ball Singles
 2021 Southeast Asian Games Nine-ball Singles
 2022 WPA World Mixed Teams 10-Ball Championship

Recognitions 
In 2019, Amit was recognized as one of the Top 100 Cebuano personalities by The Freeman, Cebu's longest-running newspaper. She was recognized alongside Tomas Osmeña, Resil Mojares, and Max Surban as part of the centennial anniversary of the local newspaper.

References

External links
 Rubilen Amit's Player Profile at AZ Billiards

1981 births
Living people
Female pool players
Filipino pool players
World champions in pool
University of Santo Tomas alumni
People from Mandaue
Sportspeople from Cebu
Cebuano people
Cue sports players at the 2006 Asian Games
Cue sports players at the 2010 Asian Games
Southeast Asian Games gold medalists for the Philippines
Southeast Asian Games competitors for the Philippines
Southeast Asian Games silver medalists for the Philippines
Southeast Asian Games bronze medalists for the Philippines
Southeast Asian Games medalists in cue sports
Competitors at the 2017 Southeast Asian Games
Asian Games competitors for the Philippines
Competitors at the 2005 Southeast Asian Games
Competitors at the 2007 Southeast Asian Games
Competitors at the 2009 Southeast Asian Games
Competitors at the 2011 Southeast Asian Games
Competitors at the 2013 Southeast Asian Games
Competitors at the 2015 Southeast Asian Games
Competitors at the 2019 Southeast Asian Games
Competitors at the 2021 Southeast Asian Games